is located in Otemae, Chūō-ku, Osaka, Japan. It has 500 beds and is run by the Osaka Prefectural government. This hospital specializes in cancer and adult illness.

History
The hospital was established on March 2017.

Departments

 Internal Medicine
Gastroenterology
Gastroenterology
Respiratory Medicine
Blood / Chemotherapy
Clinical Oncology
Surgery
Gastroenterological Surgery
Respiratory Surgery
Breast / Endocrine Surgery (breast gland, thyroid)
Neurosurgery
Gynecology
Urology
Otolaryngology (head and neck surgery)
Orthopedic Surgery
Radiotherapy
Examination Department
Digestive Examination Department
Precision Diagnosis Department (Human Dock)
Central Surgery Department
Laboratory Diagnosis Department
Isotope Department
Radiology Department
Clinical Laboratory Department
Pathology / Cytopathology Department

Transport
The hospital is 5-minute walk from Tanimachi Yonchōme Station on the Osaka Metro.

See also
 List of hospitals in Japan

References

External links
 

Hospitals in Osaka
Hospitals established in 2017
Buildings and structures in Osaka
2017 establishments in Japan